The women's 200 metre backstroke event at the 2008 Olympic Games took place on 14–16 August at the Beijing National Aquatics Center in Beijing, China.

After claiming three silver medals at these Games, Zimbabwe's Kirsty Coventry stormed home on the final lap to defend her Olympic title in the event. She posted a time of 2:05.24 to crush a world record set by U.S. swimmer Margaret Hoelzer from the Olympic trials one month earlier. Meanwhile, Hoelzer added a silver to her hardware from the 100 m backstroke, when she touched the wall in 2:06.23, the second-fastest effort of her career. Japan's Reiko Nakamura managed to repeat a bronze from Athens four years earlier, in an Asian record of 2:07.13.

Russia's top favorite Anastasia Zuyeva finished fourth with a time of 2:07.88, and was followed in the fifth spot by American teenager Elizabeth Beisel, aged 16, in 2:08.23. Elizabeth Simmonds set a new British record of 2:08.51 to earn a sixth spot, while Aussies Meagan Nay (2:08.84) and Belinda Hocking (2:10.12) closed out the field. Notable swimmers missed out the top 8 final, featuring Russia's Stanislava Komarova, silver medalist in Athens, and British top favorite Gemma Spofforth.

Before her breakthrough final, Coventry broke one of the oldest Olympic records earlier in the prelims. She posted a top-seeded time of 2:06.76 to lead 34 other swimmers in the race, slashing four-tenths of a second (0.40) off the record set by Hungary's three-time Olympic champion Krisztina Egerszegi from Barcelona in 1992.

Records
Prior to this competition, the existing world and Olympic records were as follows.

The following new world and Olympic records were set during this competition.

Results

Heats

Semifinals

Semifinal 1

Semifinal 2

Final

References

External links
Official Olympic Report

Women's backstroke 200 metre
2008 in women's swimming
Women's events at the 2008 Summer Olympics